The Canal de la Somme is a canal in northern France. Its total length is 156.4 km with 25 locks, from the English Channel at Saint-Valéry-sur-Somme to the Canal de Saint-Quentin at Saint-Simon.

History 
The Somme River was canalized beginning in 1770. The 54 km section from St. Simon to Bray was completed by 1772, but the rest was not finished until 1843.

Overview
The canal as originally built has seen substantial modifications since construction of the Canal du Nord in 1904–1965, and is now made up of four distinct sections:
  and 1 lock from Saint-Valery-sur-Somme to Abbeville (the Canal maritime)
  and 18 locks from Abbeville to Péronne
  with 2 locks the section upgraded as part of the Canal du Nord
  and 4 locks from Voyennes to Saint-Simon, closed upstream from Offoy since 2004.

Some authors distinguish the Grande Somme downstream from Péronne and the Petite Somme upstream from Voyennes. Since 2005 the latter section has been closed to navigation as a result of silt deposits.

In the 1960s, more than 300,000 tonnes of goods were transported on the canal. Today it is used largely by pleasure boats.

En Route
 PK 156 Saint-Valéry-sur-Somme
 PK 141 Abbeville
 PK 92 Amiens
 PK 34 Péronne
 PK 16 Voyennes
 PK 0 Saint-Simon

See also
List of canals in France

References

External links
 Canal de la Somme information on places, ports and moorings on the canal, by the author of Inland Waterways of France, Imray
 Navigation details for 80 French rivers and canals (French waterways website section)

Somme
Canals opened in 1772
Canals opened in 1843
1843 establishments in France